Sarah Francesca Green (born 9 March 1961) is currently a professor of social and cultural anthropology at the University of Helsinki. She is a specialist on borders, spatial relations, gender and sexuality, and information and communications technologies. She has lived in Greece, the UK, US, Italy and currently lives in Helsinki, Finland. In September 2016, Green was awarded a European Research Council (ERC) Advanced Grant to develop new research in the Mediterranean region. The project is called Crosslocations. She was also awarded an Academy of Finland Project, called Transit, Trade and Travel, which also concerns the Mediterranean, though its focus is different.

Life and career 
Sarah Green was born in  Redgrave, Suffolk. She grew up in Lesvos and Athens, where she first attended school. Following the move of her family to the UK, she continued school there. After a short period at the University of Texas at Austin, she moved back to the UK and became an undergraduate at the University of Cambridge (New Hall, now Murray Edwards College) to study the archaeology and anthropology Tripos. After another short period in the US, she began doctoral studies at Cambridge in 1988, and obtained her PhD in social anthropology in 1992.  Her professional career began as a research fellow and an affiliated lecturer at the University of Cambridge, from where she moved to Manchester University in 1995. In 2006, she was appointed as a Professor of Anthropology at the University of Manchester, where she also served as the Head of Social Anthropology (2007-2010). Green has also held visiting appointments in other UK Universities,  as well as in Finland.

Research interests and fieldwork 
Although the subject matter of her research varies considerably, Green’s major conceptual interest lies consistently in the notion of location; throughout her diverse fieldwork projects she has been exploring, in both literal and metaphorical senses, how people locate themselves in the world and in relation to themselves and others. For Green such locating practices are inextricably linked to political conditions, as well as social and epistemological elements. Her research themes include: the politics of gender and sexuality in London; the politics of the intense promotion of Information and Communications Technologies in Manchester; shifting perceptions of environment and land degradation in the Argolid Valley and northwestern Greece; concepts of border relations on the Greek-Albanian border; the appearance, disappearance and reappearance of the Balkans; the circulation of money in the Aegean; the notion of trust and the UK's new financial elites; and, most recently, the shifting concept of border in the eastern peripheries of Europe.

A considerable portion of her research work was undertaken in the context of interdisciplinary research teams. Early on in her career Green participated in Archaeomedes I and II (1993-2000), which were EU funded projects exploring environmental perceptions and policy making. From 2004 onwards she has been involved in various research activities as a co-ordinator within the ESRC Centre for Research in Socio-Cultural Change. Since 2006, she has been developing an international research network dedicated to exploring both conceptually and empirically issues related to borders and bordering practices on the eastern periphery of Europe. EastBordNet was funded by COST (Cooperation of Science and Technology in Europe) in 2008 and Green acted as the PI and chair of the Action. A range of themes related to border research (border techniques, gender, money, etc.) have been explored and a fresh conceptual approach towards the study of borders has been developed (e.g. tidemarks). The network included 27 countries and over 280 scholars by the time (Jan 2013) it held its second international conference in Berlin. The network continues, though it is no longer funded by COST. 
A new book series entitled Rethinking Borders is about to be launched by the Manchester University Press, with Green as series editor; the series will host edited collections and monographs on borders research coming out of the EastBordNet project.

In 2011, she was invited to be the executive program director of the American Anthropological Association, which is the biggest international conference in the field of anthropology  and was hosted in Montreal. She was also the former chair of the External Advisory Board between 2013 and 2017 of HAU: Journal of Ethnographic Theory.

Selected publications
2013 Borderwork: a visual journey through periphery frontier regions. With Lena Malm. Helsinki: Jasilti.
2005 Notes from the Balkans: Locating Marginality and Ambiguity on the Greek-Albanian Border. Princeton, N.J. and Oxford: Princeton University Press. 
Winner of the Douglass award for best contribution to Europeanist Anthropology 2006 (Society of Europeanist Anthropology, American Anthropological Association). Has been translated into Polish and Greek

1997 Urban Amazons: Lesbian Feminism and Beyond in the Gender, Sexuality and Identity Battles of London. London: Macmillan.

References 

1961 births
Living people
British anthropologists
British women anthropologists
People from Redgrave, Suffolk
Fellows of the Institute of Advanced Study (Durham)